Oceanobacillus neutriphilus is a bacterium. It is Gram-positive, neutrophilic, and rod-shaped its type strain being strain A1gT (=5CGMCC 1.7693T =5JCM 15776T).

References

Further reading
Staley, James T., et al. "Bergey's manual of systematic bacteriology, vol. 3."Williams and Wilkins, Baltimore, MD (1989): 2250–2251.

External links

LPSN
Type strain of Oceanobacillus neutriphilus at BacDive -  the Bacterial Diversity Metadatabase

Bacillaceae
Bacteria described in 2010